The 2009 World Cup Taekwondo Team Championships is the 2nd edition of the World Cup Taekwondo Team Championships, and was held at Baku Sports Hall in Baku, Azerbaijan from June 11 to June 14, 2009.

The participating male and female teams are divided into six groups each and the top four countries at the previous championship and the host country are seeded. Top six teams and two best-record teams among the second-placed teams in the men's and women's division of the preliminary round advance to the quarterfinal round. The quarterfinal, semifinal and final matches are conducted in a single elimination format.

Medalists

Men

Preliminary round

Group A

Group B

Group C

Group D

Group E

Group F

Knockout round

Women

Preliminary round

Group A

Group B

Group C

Group D

Group E

Group F

Knockout round

References

External links
 WTF Medal Winners

World Cup
Taekwondo World Cup
World Cup Taekwondo Team Championships
Taekwondo Championships